Emiel Van Cauter (2 December 1931 – 26 October 1975) was a Belgian racing cyclist. He won the Belgian national road race title in 1955.

References

External links

1931 births
1975 deaths
Belgian male cyclists
Cyclists from Flemish Brabant
People from Meise